The Lucas wedge is an economic measure of how much higher the gross domestic product would have been if it grew as fast as it should have. It shows the loss from deadweight caused by poor or inefficient economic policy choices. A Lucas wedge was named after Robert E. Lucas Jr. an American economist who won the 1995 Nobel Memorial Prize in Economic Sciences for his research on rational expectations.

The Lucas wedge is not the same as the Okun's Law. While they are similar and often confused, the gap from Okun's Law measures the difference over a period of time between the actual GDP and the GDP that would have been realized at full employment. Over time the Lucas wedge compounds and increases and so it is usually larger than the gap from Okun's Law. This shows that the goal of economic policy should be more than just realizing full employment but should also focus on optimizing investment to reduce the Lucas wedge.

The Lucas wedge is sometimes expressed in per capita terms to reflect how much better a person's standard of living would be in the absence of this gap.

References

Economic theories
Gross domestic product
1995 in economics
Economics laws